Yasuhiko Matsunaga (born 3 July 1961 from Shizuoka) is a Japanese former professional darts player, who played in Professional Darts Corporation events.

Career
Matsunaga played in two PDC World Darts Championships, in 2005 and 2006, but he did not win a set on either appearance.

World Championship performances results

PDC
 2005: Last 48: (lost to Jason Clark 0–3) (sets)
 2006: Last 64: (lost to Wes Newton 0–3)

References

External links

1961 births
Living people
Japanese darts players
Professional Darts Corporation associate players